Brandon DeFazio (born September 13, 1988) is a Canadian professional ice hockey player. He is currently an unrestricted free agent. He most recently played for Schwenninger Wild Wings of the Deutsche Eishockey Liga (DEL).

Playing career
Prior to turning professional, DeFazio attended Clarkson University where he played four seasons of NCAA Division I men's ice hockey with the Clarkson Golden Knights men's ice hockey team. After graduating from his senior year with Clarkson, DeFazio joined the Pittsburgh Penguins affiliate teams, the Wheeling Nailers of the ECHL and the Wilkes-Barre/Scranton Penguins to end the 2010–11 season.

DeFazio was signed by Wilkes-Barre to a one-year AHL contract, and was also given a try-out and attended Pittsburgh's NHL training camp for the 2011–12 season.

On July 2, 2012, DeFazio signed as a free agent to a one-year, two way contract with the New York Islanders. A year later, though, DeFazio left the Islanders organization as a free agent and signed a one-year contract with the Vancouver Canucks on July 12, 2013.

In the 2014–15 season, DeFazio received his first NHL recall by the Canucks on November 9, 2014. He made his long-awaited NHL debut that night in a 2–1 shootout victory over the Anaheim Ducks. DeFazio played in his second career game on November 11 against the Ottawa Senators, where he collected the first shot of his career while playing 5 minutes and 49 seconds.

On July 6, 2015, having left the Canucks as a free agent, DeFazio returned to the Eastern Conference in signing a one-year, two-way contract with the Boston Bruins.

In the off-season, DeFazio left the Bruins organization as a free agent an on July 25, 2016, he was signed to a one-year contract to continue in the AHL with the Texas Stars. In the 2016–17 season, DeFazio compiled a career best 47 points in appearing in every regular season game with Texas.

After 6 seasons largely in the AHL, DeFazio as a free agent agreed to a one-year deal with Chinese club, HC Kunlun Red Star of the Kontinental Hockey League (KHL) on June 6, 2017.

DeFazio left Kunlun for the following 2018–19 season, signing a years contract with Lukko of the Finnish Liiga, before returning for a second stint with Kunlun for the 2019–20 season.

As a free agent during the COVID-19 pandemic, DeFazio was later signed to a contract with Czech Extraliga club, HC Kometa Brno, on November 17, 2020. Scoreless in 6 games with Brno in the 2020–21 season, DeFazio left the ELH to be the final addition to German DEL club, ERC Ingolstadt, on December 5, 2020.

On June 9, 2022, DeFazio signed as a free agent to a one-year contract with fellow German club, Schwenninger Wild Wings, for the 2022–23 season. DeFazio would feature in every regular season game with the Wild Wings, collecting 10 goals and 21 points. Unable to help Schwenninger advance to the post-season, it was announced DeFazio would leave the club at the conclusion of his contract on March 9, 2022.

Personal life

His father, Dean DeFazio, also played professional hockey within the Penguins organization. DeFazio was recognized for his work in the community, earning his AHL team's, man of the year award, multiple times. He is also currently married with one baby girl and a second child on the way.

Career statistics

References

External links

1988 births
Living people
Bridgeport Sound Tigers players
Canadian ice hockey left wingers
Clarkson Golden Knights men's ice hockey players
ERC Ingolstadt players
HC Kometa Brno players
HC Kunlun Red Star players
Lukko players
Canadian expatriate ice hockey players in Finland
People from Oakville, Ontario
Providence Bruins players
Schwenninger Wild Wings players
Texas Stars players
Undrafted National Hockey League players
Utica Comets players
Vancouver Canucks players
Wheeling Nailers players
Wilkes-Barre/Scranton Penguins players
Canadian expatriate ice hockey players in the United States
Canadian expatriate ice hockey players in Germany
Canadian expatriate ice hockey players in the Czech Republic
Canadian expatriate ice hockey players in China
Ice hockey people from Ontario